Redken is an American hair care brand owned by L'Oréal Group under the Professional Products division.

History
The company was founded in 1960 by Jheri Redding and Paula Kent, thus the name, "Red-ken." Redken pioneered the "Scientific Approach to Beauty," and revolutionized the professional salon business by introducing the concept of protein reconditioning and developing new protein based products, which they patented.

In 1993, with sales at $160 million, Redken was sold to Cosmair, Inc.

Marketing
In 2014 Lea T became the face of Redken, thus making her the first openly transgender model to front a global cosmetics brand.

In 2015, Suki Waterhouse became the face of Redken.

For the company's national and international experience in sustainable development, and eco-friendly products, the Environment Possibility Award conferred the "Award of Earth Defender" to Redken in 2020.

References

External links
Official website

Hair care products
L'Oréal brands
American companies established in 1960
American brands